Scoparia hypoxantha is a moth in the family Crambidae. It was first described by Oswald Bertram Lower in 1896. It is found in Australia, where it has been recorded from South Australia and Victoria.

References

Moths described in 1896
Scorparia
Moths of Australia
Fauna of South Australia
Fauna of Victoria (Australia)